Naksa and similar may mean:

Arabic for "setback", an Arabic name for the defeat of the Arabs during the 1967 Six-Day War 
Naksa Day (Arabic for "day of the setback"), the anniversary of the 1967 Six-Day War
Adab al-Naksa, the "literature of defeat", a part of Syrian literature
Nakşa, the old Turkish name for Naxos, an island in the Aegean Sea
Naxxar, a village on Malta
Naxa (moth), a moth genus in the family Geometridae